José Arribas (16 January 1921 – 28 September 1989) was a Spanish professional football player and manager. As a player, he was a midfielder. He mostly notably coached Nantes from 1960 to 1976, where he created the "jeu à la nantaise", a tactic based on speed, technique, intelligence and one touch play. He also coached the France national team along with Jean Snella after the 1966 FIFA World Cup.

Career
At the age of 14, Arribas left Spain for France because of the Spanish Civil War, and landed in Nantes. Fond of football, he signed a professional contract with Le Mans in the Division 2. In 1952, he became a coach and trained amateur sides of Saint-Malo and Noyen-sur-Sarthe, before being called up by Nantes, where he won the Division 1 titles in 1965, 1966 and 1973. In 1966, he coached for four matches France national team with Jean Snella. Arribas left Nantes in 1976, and ended his career coaching Marseille and Lille.

Personal life 
Arribas's son Claude was also a footballer. He coached him at Nantes.

Honours
Nantes
 Division 1: 1964–65, 1965–66, 1972–73

See also
 List of longest managerial reigns in association football

References
Profile
A site dedicated to him

1921 births
1989 deaths
Footballers from Bilbao
Spanish footballers
French footballers
Spanish football managers
French football managers
Le Mans FC players
FC Nantes managers
France national football team managers
Lille OSC managers
Olympique de Marseille managers
Ligue 1 managers
Association football midfielders
Exiles of the Spanish Civil War in France
French people of Spanish descent
French people of Basque descent